David Kalivoda (born 25 August 1982, in Ledeč nad Sázavou) is a Czech football player who currently plays for 1. FK Příbram. He is a midfielder.

External links
 Player profile 
 Guardian Football

1982 births
Living people
People from Ledeč nad Sázavou
Czech footballers
SK Slavia Prague players
FC Zbrojovka Brno players
FK Chmel Blšany players
FK Teplice players
FK Viktoria Žižkov players
1. FK Příbram players
Czech First League players
Association football midfielders
Sportspeople from the Vysočina Region